Methodist Episcopal Church, South is a former religious denomination.

Methodist Episcopal Church, South or Methodist Episcopal Church South may also refer to:
 Methodist Episcopal Church, South (Daphne, Alabama), listed on the National Register of Historic Places (NRHP) in Baldwin County
 Methodist Episcopal Church, South (Bald Knob, Arkansas), NRHP-listed in White County
 Methodist Episcopal Church, South (Dardanelle, Arkansas), NRHP-listed in Yell County
 Methodist Episcopal Church, South (Paris, Arkansas), NRHP-listed in Logan County
 Methodist Episcopal Church South (Greenup, Kentucky), NRHP-listed in Greenup County
 Methodist Episcopal Church South (Mount Sterling, Kentucky) 
 Methodist Episcopal Church, South (Prestonsburg, Kentucky)
 Methodist Episcopal Church South (Corvallis, Montana)
 Methodist Episcopal Church, South (Checotah, Oklahoma), NRHP-listed in McIntosh County
 Methodist Episcopal Church, South (Lawton, Oklahoma), NRHP-listed in Comanche County
 Methodist Episcopal Church South (Albany, Oregon), NRHP-listed in Linn County
 Methodist Episcopal Church South (Roseburg, Oregon), NRHP-listed in Douglas County

See also
Methodist Episcopal Church (disambiguation)